The 2016 World Rugby Pacific Nations Cup was the eleventh edition of the World Rugby Pacific Nations Cup (formerly known as the IRB Pacific Nations Cup), an annual international rugby union tournament. The 2016 title was contested by the Pacific nations of Fiji, Samoa and Tonga. Fiji won title and was undefeated in the two matches the team played.

Teams competing in previous years, Canada, Japan and the United States were not scheduled to participate in the tournament for 2016 and 2017 due to the 2019 Rugby World Cup qualifying format. The top two teams on aggregate across the 2016 and 2017 Pacific Nations Cups qualified for Japan 2019, with the team finishing third scheduled to enter the repechage for qualification.

Table

Fixtures
The full match schedule was announced on 19 February 2015.

Round 1

Notes:
 Naulia Dawai, Patrick Osborne, Eremasi Radrodro, Savenaca Tabakanalagi, Samisoni Viriviri and Serupepeli Vularika (all Fiji) and Sione Anga’aelangi, Sione Faletau, Kali Hala, Daniel Kilioni, Apakuki Ma’afu, Fusi Malimali, Sione Tau and Nafi Tuitavake (all Tonga) made their international debuts.
 Referee Nigel Owens refereed his 71st game, surpassing Jonathan Kaplan's 70-games refereed record set in 2013.

Round 2

Notes:
 Eroni Vasiteri (Fiji) and Greg Foe (Samoa) made their international debuts.

Round 3

Notes:
 Martin Naufahu (Tonga) made his international debut.

Squads

Note: Number of caps and players' ages are indicated as of 11 June 2016 – the tournament's opening day, pre first tournament match.

Fiji
On 20 May, Head Coach John McKee announced a 28-man squad for the Pacific Nations Cup and their June test against Georgia.

On 7 June, Samisoni Viriviri joined the squad.

Winger Adriu Delai and lock Savenaca Tabakanalagi were late additions to the squad ahead of the Tongan fixture on 11 June.

Samoa
On 10 May, Head Coach Alama Ieremia announced a 40-man extended squad for the Pacific Nations Cup and their June test against Georgia.

Tonga
On 3 June, head coach Toutai Kefu announced a 28-man squad ahead of Tonga's June test against Georgia and the Pacific Nations Cup.

References

External links

2016
2016 rugby union tournaments for national teams
2016 in Oceanian rugby union
2016 in Fijian rugby union
2016 in Samoan rugby union
2016 in Tongan rugby union